This is a list of compositions by the English composer Thomas Tallis (c. 1505–1585).

Masses
Missa Salve intemerata 
Salve Intemerata: Gloria
Salve Intemerata: Credo
Salve Intemerata: Sanctus & Benedictus
Salve Intemerata: Agnus Dei
Missa Puer natus est nobis (on the chant)
Mass: Puer natus est nobis: Gloria
Mass: Puer natus est nobis: Credo [only a fragment survives]
Mass: Puer natus est nobis: Sanctus & Benedictus
Mass: Puer natus est nobis: Agnus Dei
 Mass for Four Voices
 Gloria
 Credo
 Sanctus
 Benedictus
 Agnus Dei
Kyrie: Deus Creator

Latin motets
Absterge Domine
Audivi Vocem De Coelo (Responsory for Matins)
Ave Dei Patris Filia (Votive antiphon)
Ave rosa sine spinis (Votive antiphon)
Derelinquat Impius
Domine, Quis Habitabit
Dum transisset Sabbatum (Responsory for Matins)
Gaude gloriosa Dei mater (Votive antiphon)
In Ieiunio Et Fletu 
In Manus Tuas (Responsory for Compline)
In Pace In Idipsum (Responsory for Compline)
Jam Christus astra ascenderat (Vespers hymn)
Jesu Salvator saeculi (Compline hymn)
Lamentations of Jeremiah I
Lamentations of Jeremiah II
Laudate Dominum
Loquebantur variis linguis (Responsory for Vespers)
Miserere Nostri
O Nata Lux De Lumine (Hymn for Lauds)
O Sacrum Convivium Antiphon for Magnificat)
O Salutaris Hostia
Quod Chorus Vatum (Vespers hymn)
Salvator Mundi (two versions) 
Salve intemerata virgo (Votive antiphon)
Sancte Deus (Jesus antiphon)
Sermone Blando (Hymn for Lauds)
Spem In Alium
Suscipe quaeso
Te Lucis Ante Terminum (Ferial)
Te Lucis Ante Terminum (Festal)
Videte Miraculum (Responsory for Vespers)

English service music
Preces (1st Set)
Preces (2nd Set)
Christ Rising Again from the Dead
Venite
Te Deum
Benedictus
Responses And Collects For Easter Matins
Litany
Magnificat
Nunc Dimittis
Responses And Collects For Christmas Eve Evensong
Commandments
Credo
Offertory Sentence
Sanctus
Gloria

English anthems
O Lord, Give Thy Holy Spirit
Purge Me, O Lord
Verily, Verily I Say Unto You
Remember Not, O Lord God
O Lord, In Thee Is All My Trust
Out From The Deep
Remember Not, O Lord God
Hear The Voice And Prayer
If Ye Love Me
A New Commandment
Wherewithal Shall A Young Man
O Do Well Unto Thy Servant
My Soul Cleaveth To The Dust
Wipe Away My Sins
Forgive Me, Lord, My Sin
Blessed Are Those That Be Undefiled
Arise, O Lord, And Hear
With All Our Hearts
I Call And Cry To Thee
O Sacred And Holy Banquet
When Jesus Went Into Simon The Pharisee’s House
Blessed Be Thy Name
O Praise The Lord II
Sing and Glorify Heaven's High Majesty
 The set of nine vernacular psalm settings referred to as the nine tunes for Archbishop Parker's Psalter
Man Blest No Doubt (Psalm 1)
Let God Arise In Majesty Psalm 68
Why Fum'th In Sight (Psalm 2, tune known as the third mode melody, see also Fantasia on a Theme of Thomas Tallis)
O Come In One To Praise The Lord (Psalm 95)
E'en Like The Hunted Hind (Psalm 42)
Expend, O Lord, My Plaint (Psalm 5)
Why Brag'st In Malice High (Psalm 52)
God Grant With Grace (Psalm 67, tune known as Tallis' Canon)
Ordinal (Veni Creator)

Keyboard works
Veni Redemptor Gentium
Jam Lucis Orto Sidere
Ecce Tempus Idoneum
Ex More Docti Mistico
Clarifica Me Pater
Clarifica Me Pater (II)
Clarifica Me Pater (III)
Gloria Tibi Trinitas
Iste Confessor
Alleluia: Per Te Dei Genitrix
Felix Namque (I)
Felix Namque (II)
When Shall My Sorrowful Sighing Slack
Like As The Doleful Dove
O Ye Tender Babes
Purge Me, O Lord
Per Haec Nos
A Point
Lesson: Two Partes In One
Remember Not, O Lord God
Per Haec Nos
A Point
Lesson: Two Partes In One
Tu Nimirum

Consort music
In Nomine I
In Nomine II
A Solfing Song
Salvator Mundi (trio)
Fantasia

References

Brilliant Classics: Tallis: Complete Works
Signum Records - Thomas Tallis: The Complete Works
Booklet from the Complete Works 10-CD box set
 

Tallis, Thomas

Thomas Tallis